Botrychium simplex, the little grapefern, is a species of fern in the family Ophioglossaceae that is native to North America and Greenland. It is a perennial.

Conservation status in the United States
It is listed as a special concern species in Connecticut and is believed extirpated.  It is endangered in Illinois, Indiana, and Ohio. It is listed as endangered and extirpated in Maryland, threatened in Iowa, exploitably vulnerable in New York, special concern in Rhode Island, and sensitive in Washington (state).

Conservation status in Europe
This species is extremely rare in most European countries. In Ukraine only one place is known.

References

Ferns of the United States
simplex
Plants described in 1823

Flora of Greenland